Daroga Prasad Rai Road, officially Daroga Prasad Rai Path, is major thoroughfare, which runs through the upscale part of Western Patna in India. Serpentine Road is a residential street, which connects Hartali Mor and Beer Chand Patel Marg. The area is served by Shastrinagar Police Station under Patna Police.

Landmarks/Nearby places
R Block  ~0.3 km
Bihar Museum  ~0.3 km
60 Officers' Flat  ~0.5 km
Government Quarters- Officer's Flat  ~0.5 km
Lake  ~0.6 km
Mount Carmel High School  ~0.7 km
Eco Park  ~0.8 km
12 Bailey Road  ~0.9 km
Punaichak  1 km
A N College professors colony  ~1.3 km
Patna High Court

References

Neighbourhoods in Patna